"Mr. Botibol" is a short story by Roald Dahl, first collected in 1980 in the short story collection More Tales of the Unexpected by Penguin.

Synopsis
Mr. Botibol is a timid, middle-aged bachelor who feels he has achieved nothing in life. He constructs a small concert hall in his house where he conducts imaginary recitals to gramophone records. He also purchases a grand piano with keys that do not emit musical notes when struck, fantasising that he is a great musician-composer as he "plays" the instrument. In a music shop he meets Lucille Darlington, a fellow music-lover, who eventually accepts his invitation to play the role of pianist in one of his "concerts". Much to Botibol's surprise, Lucille then reveals that she is a piano teacher.

Adaptations
Although the main character bears the same unusual surname as the ill-fated protagonist of an earlier Dahl story, Dip in the Pool, the two stories are otherwise unrelated. Nevertheless, when these two stories were adapted for television's Tales of the Unexpected,  the same actor, Jack Weston, played "Botibol" in both episodes.

An independent short film loosely based on the story was released by Paisley Films in 2013.

References

External links
"Mr. Botibol" at roalddahlfans.com
"Mr. Botibol" - 2013 short film at Vimeo

1980 short stories
Short stories by Roald Dahl